Chadlington is a village and civil parish in the Evenlode Valley about  south of Chipping Norton, Oxfordshire. The village has five neighbourhoods: Brookend, Eastend, Greenend, Millend and Westend.

Archaeology
Bowl barrows range from late Neolithic to late Bronze Age, i.e. 2400 to 1500 BC. The barrow is a scheduled monument. It is a scheduled monument.

Manors
Chadlington village existed by the time of Domesday Book in 1086 and may be named after Saint Chad. The present Chadlington Manor House was built in the 17th century and remodelled in about 1800. It is a Grade II* listed building.  Lower Court farmhouse was built in about 1700 as the manor house for Westend. It was altered in the mid- to late-18th century and remodelled in the 19th. The house has a Stonesfield Slate roof. It is a Grade II* listed building.

Churches and chapel

Church of England
The Church of England parish church of Saint Nicholas was originally Norman, and the blocked head of a Norman window above the north arcade show that the building had a clerestory in Norman times. In the 13th century, Early English Gothic north and south aisles were added, with four-bay arcades linking the aisles with the nave. Both aisles still retain some lancet windows from this period.  The bell tower was built early in the 14th century in the Decorated Gothic style. A chapel was added at the east end of the north aisle. The chapel's east and north windows in the Transitional style between Decorated and Perpendicular Gothic date it to the chancel about the middle of the 14th century. Later pure Perpendicular Gothic additions include the windows and north door in the north aisle, the present clerestory and nave roof and the chancel arch. In 1870, the Gothic Revival architect Charles Buckeridge completely rebuilt the chancel. St. Nicholas' church is a Grade II* listed building.

The tower has a ring of six bells. Abraham I Rudhall of Gloucester cast the second and third bells in 1714. William Taylor of Loughborough cast the fifth and tenor bells in 1846 at the bellfoundry he then had in Oxford. Thomas Bond of Burford cast the fourth bell in 1911. The Whitechapel Bell Foundry cast the present tenor bell in 2006. There is also a Sanctus bell that Thomas Bond cast in 1911.  In 2001, the Church of England Benefice of Ascott-under-Wychwood, Chadlington and Spelsbury merged with that of Enstone and Heythrop to form the Chase Benefice.  The Parsonage was designed by William Wilkinson and built in 1863. It is now Chadlington House.

Baptist
Chadlington Baptist chapel was built in 1840. It is now a private house.

Methodist

Chadlington has a Methodist church. It is a member of Chipping Norton and Stow on the Wold Methodist Circuit.

Social and economic history

Chadlington used to have three public houses, the Malt Shovel (closed down), the Tite Inn, and the Sandys Arms. The Tite Inn was closed between 2009 and 2012; it reopened in 2012 with new owners. and the Sandys Arms on Bull Hill closed some years earlier.  Sir Henry Rawlinson (1810–95) and his brother Canon George Rawlinson (1812–1902) were born in Chadlington. Ivan Cameron, son of former Conservative Party Leader and Prime Minister David Cameron is buried in Chadlington.

Amenities

Chadlington Football Club play in the Witney and District League. As of January 2023, it has a teams in Division One and another in division four as well as a youth team. Chadlington Cricket Club play in the Oxfordshire Cricket Association League. Both clubs are based at Chadlington Sports and Social Club. Chadlington also has a primary school and a playgroup.  An annual fun run is held along Coldron Brook: The Great Brook Run. Proceeds of the race, which starts and ends at The Tite Inn, go to the parish primary school. Former Witney MP and Prime Minister  David Cameron has taken part in the event.

In popular culture
Chadlington is the location for filming of the television documentary series Clarkson's Farm about Jeremy Clarkson and his farm on the edge of the village.

References

Sources and further reading

External links

 Chadlington on Google Maps

Civil parishes in Oxfordshire
Villages in Oxfordshire
West Oxfordshire District
Cotswolds